The 2016–17 season  will be Anorthosis' 68th consecutive season in the Cypriot First Division, the top division of Cyprus football. It covers a period from 1 July 2016 to 30 May 2017.

Season overview

Transfer activity
Anorthosis Famagusta commenced their summer transfer activity on 3 June, by signing Serbian football player Milan Savić from Novi Pazar for 1+2 years.

On 17 June, Anorthosis announced the signing of Spanish footballers Cristóbal Márquez Crespo from CD Toledo for 1+1 years. and Alberto Aguilar Leiva from Western Sydney Wanderers for a year.

Players

Transfers

In

Total spending:  €130,000

Out

Pre-season friendlies

Season 2016-17

Cyprus Cup 2016-17

Squad statistics

Statistics accurate as of 7 November 2016.

References

Anorthosis Famagusta F.C. seasons
Cypriot football clubs 2016–17 season